Stephen Murphy (born 1996) is an Irish hurler who plays as a goalkeeper for the Kerry senior team.

Born in Causeway, County Kerry, Murphy first played competitive hurling during his schooling at Causeway Comprehensive School. He arrived on the inter-county scene at the age of sixteen when he first linked up with the Kerry minor team before later joining the under-21 side. He made his senior debut during the 2015 league. Murphy quickly became a regular member of the starting fifteen and has won one Christy Ring Cup medal.

At club level Murphy plays with Causeway.

Honours

Team

Kerry
Christy Ring Cup (1): 2015
National League (Division 2A) (1): 2015
All-Ireland Minor B Hurling Championship (2): 2013, 2014
All-Ireland U21 B Hurling Championship 2017

Causeway
Kerry Senior Hurling Championship (1) 2019
Kerry Under-21 hurling championship (3) 2014, 2015, 2017

References

1996 births
Living people
Causeway hurlers
Kerry inter-county hurlers
Hurling goalkeepers